Nikhila Vimal is a South Indian actress who predominantly works in Malayalam film industry and has acted in a few Tamil and Telugu films.

She debuted in Tamil with the film Vetrivel (2016), playing the role of Latha. She went on to appear in super hit films like Kidaari (2016), Aravindante Athidhikal (2018), Njan Prakashan (2018), Mera Naam Shaji (2019), Oru Yamandan Premakadha (2019), Thambi (2019), Anjaam Pathiraa (2020), The Priest (2021), Madhuram (2021) and Jo and Jo (2022).

Personal life 

Nikhila Vimal was born in Taliparamba, Kerala to late M. R. Pavithran and Kalamandalam Vimaladevi. Her father was retired from statistical department while her mother is a dancer. Her elder sister Akhila Vimal is a research scholar in Theater arts at Jawaharlal Nehru University, Delhi. The name 'Vimal' comes from the name of her mother. Nikhila Vimal learned Bharata Natyam, Kuchipudi, Kerala Natanam and monoact, she also made her presence in youth festivals. She graduated her B.Sc. (Botany) in 2016 from Sir Syed College, Taliparamba.

Career 

She started her acting career in television in a documentary on Saint Alphonsa which was aired on Shalom TV.Her debut film was Bhagyadevatha in 2009 in supporting role.Her big screen debut in lead role happened in 2015, where she did the female lead in Sreebala K Menon's film Love 24x7 (2015)  in which she was paired with Dileep. Her Tamil debut happens to be Panjumittai in which she is the female lead and opposite to Ma Ka Pa Anand. Her second Tamil film is Onbathu Kuzhi Sampath, which is yet to be released. Her first Tamil release was Vetrivel (2016). She appeared in the film as one among three heroines, as Latha. Her performance in Vetrivel (2016) was praised by all. Though her role was simple, she was noticed by everyone for her performance in that film. Nikhila then got an offer to play as a lead in M.Sasikumar's own production Kidaari (2016) as a pair to Sasikumar again. Kidaari (2016) was well received and commercially successful and her role as Chemba was appreciated by critics for her natural performance. Her Telugu debut movie is  Meda Meeda Abbayi with actor Allari Naresh. Her third Malayalam movie  Aravindante Athidhikal was also well received by the audience. Her last release of 2018 was the Sathyan Anthikad movie Njan Prakashan starring Fahadh Faasil in the lead role.

In 2017 Nikhila Vimal was nominated for Best Debut Actress for Kidaari in SIIMA Awards 2017. In 2019 Nikhila Vimal Won Most popular Actress Award for Aravindante Athidhikal in Kerala Kaumudi Flash movie 2019. She also Won Best star pair of the year award for Aravindante Athidhikal in Vanitha Film Awards 2019

Filmography

Television

Awards and nominations

References

External links 

Living people
Indian film actresses
21st-century Indian actresses
Actresses from Kerala
Actresses in Tamil cinema
Actresses in Malayalam cinema
People from Kannur district
Actresses in Telugu cinema
1994 births
Actresses in Malayalam television